Poison Ivy is an ongoing American comic book written by G. Willow Wilson, with art primarily by Marcio Takara. The series centers on the DC Comics villain Poison Ivy who, following the events of the "Fear State" crossover, finds herself depowered and dying. Before she dies, Ivy sets out to complete one final mission to destroy the human race.

Originally intended as a miniseries, Poison Ivy was later expanded into an ongoing series by DC Comics. The first issue was published by DC Comics on June 7, 2022, with subsequent issues published monthly.

Publication history
Poison Ivy is a DC Comics character who was first introduced as a plant-themed Batman villain in 1966. Beginning in the 1990s, a significant aspect of the character has been her relationship with Harley Quinn. A miniseries starring Poison Ivy was announced by DC Comics in March 2022 as part of the publisher's "Pride Month" initiative. Poison Ivy was originally intended to be a six-issue miniseries written by G. Willow Wilson with art by Marcio Takara, coloring by Arif Prianto, and lettering by Hassan Otsmane-Elhaou. In August 2022, DC Comics announced that the miniseries would be extended by an additional six issues, with Atagun Ilhan joining Takara in illustrating the second arc. In February 2023, DC Comics announced that the miniseries would be further expanded into an ongoing series.

The first issue was published by DC Comics on June 7, 2022, with subsequent issues published monthly.

Synopsis
The miniseries takes place after the events of the DC Comics "Fear State" crossover storyline. Poison Ivy finds herself severely depowered and dying. Before she dies, she sets out to complete one final mission to save the Earth by spreading deadly fungal spores that will end humanity once and for all.

Themes
Poison Ivy's villainy is often motivated by a desire to protect the natural environment from man-made destruction, and the climate change crisis is at the forefront of the story. Wilson was particularly interested in exploring the juxtaposition between Ivy's noble goal to save the Earth and the "questionable-to-evil" lengths she will go to achieve it.

Wilson also described Poison Ivy as a "love story from the perspective of a villain." It features Ivy and Harley's relationship prominently, with most of the miniseries being told in the form of letters that Ivy writes to Harley. According to the writer, the miniseries depicts "plant-based body horror" which was new territory for her.

Critical reception
According to review aggregator Comic Book Roundup, the first issue scored an average of 8.9/10 based on 15 reviews, while the ongoing series as a whole averaged 8.7/10 based on 57 reviews as of November 2, 2022.

Reviewing the first issue, Bleeding Cool's James Hepplewhite wrote that it was a promising start, while ComicBook.com's Nicole Drum thought it was "very close to perfect" but did not like how Ivy and Harley's relationship was portrayed. In their reviews of the second issue, both Drum and AIPT Comics' David Brooke praised the complex and humanized version of Ivy presented by Wilson. However, Brooke found that some of the supporting characters were written as idealized caricatures, which in turn made Ivy come off as somewhat heartless in her willingness to kill them.

References

2022 comics debuts
Batman spin-off titles
DC Comics titles
LGBT-related comics
Poison Ivy (character)